Sir William Errington Hume  (14 July 1879, Newcastle-on-Tyne – 1 January 1960) was a British physician and cardiologist.

Biography
After education at Repton, William Errington Hume matriculated in October 1897 at Pembroke College, Cambridge and graduated there BA in 1900. After medical education at the London Hospital, he graduated MB BChir and MA in 1904 and MD in 1913 from the University of Cambridge. 

At the London Hospital, he clerked for Sir Bertrand Dawson. At the Royal Victoria Infirmary, after holding junior appointments from 1904 to 1907,
at age 28 he was appointed assistant physician and, six months later, full physician. He held this post until 1939 when he retired as consulting physician. He qualified MRCP in 1909.

In WWI, Hume served from 1914 to 1919 in the RAMC, attaining the rank of colonel. He was elected FRCP in 1917. He was mentioned twice in despatches and made in 1919 Companion of the Order of St Michael and St George.

On 21 February 1922, Hume wrote to John Cowan (1870–1947) with a suggestion for those physicians who had been attending meetings to give advice on heart disease to the Ministry of Pensions. Hume suggested that those physicians should be called together at the next meeting of the Association of Physicians of Great Britain and Ireland. The cardiologists' meeting, chaired by Alexander George Gibson (1875–1950), formed the Cardiac Club on 22 April 1922. 

The Cardiac Club became in 1937 the Cardiac Society of Great Britain and Ireland. The Society was renamed in 1946 the British Cardiac Society and renamed in 2006 the British Cardiovascular Society.

Under the auspices of the Royal College of Physicians, Hume gave in 1930 the Bradshaw Lecture on Paroxysmal tachycardia and in 1943 the Harveian Oration on The Physician in War—in Harvey's Time and After. He held the chair of medicine of Durham University for several years before WWII.

After retiring in 1939 from the Honorary Staff of the Royal Victoria Infirmary, Hume became a cardiologist at the Newcastle General Hospital and helped to initiate a Regional Cardiovascular Department there. From 1950 onward he suffered increasingly from arthritis. He was knighted in 1952.

Family
George Haliburton Hume (1845–1923), surgeon to the Newcastle Infirmary, was William Errington Hume's father. William Hume's younger brother was killed in WWI. 

In 1918, William Hume married Marie Élisabeth Tisseyre, eldest daughter of a colonel in the French Army. The couple (a Protestant husband and a French Catholic mother) had two sons and three daughters. Their elder son George Haliburton Hume became Basil Cardinal Hume, English Roman Catholic bishop, later Cardinal. Their younger son, John Hume, became a medical doctor in Sunderland. Their eldest daughter, Madeleine Frances Hume, married Sir John Charles.

Selected publications

with S. J. Clegg: 
with Bertrand Dawson and S. P. Bedson: 

with Paul Szekely:

References 

1879 births
1960 deaths
People educated at Repton School
Alumni of Pembroke College, Cambridge
British cardiologists
Alumni of the London Hospital Medical College
Fellows of the Royal College of Physicians
Royal Army Medical Corps officers
Companions of the Order of St Michael and St George
Knights Bachelor